Wrestling Swordfish is a 1931 American short adventure film produced by Mack Sennett. In 1932, it won an Oscar for Best Short Subject (Novelty) at the 5th Academy Awards.

References

External links
 

1931 films
1931 adventure films
American black-and-white films
American adventure films
Live Action Short Film Academy Award winners
Mack Sennett Comedies short films
1930s English-language films
1930s American films
English-language adventure films